The Clachan is a public house at 33 Kingly Street, London W1.

It is a Grade II listed building, built in 1898, but the architect is not known.

References

External links

Grade II listed pubs in the City of Westminster